The Jaguaricatu River Canyon (Portuguese: Cânion do Rio Jaguaricatu) is a canyon in Sengés, Paraná, Brazil.

See also
Jaguaricatu River
Jaguariaíva River Canyon

References

Canyons of Paraná
Landforms of Paraná (state)
Sengés